Linwei District, is a district of the city of Weinan, Shaanxi province, China. The district was established in 1995, renamed from the county-level Weinan city. It is the location of Weinan Normal University, the High-Speed Weinan North Railway Station and the main Weinan Railway Station. From 1995 to 2016, it was the only district of Weinan city.

Administrative divisions
Linwei District has nine Subdistricts and sixteen towns.

Subdistrict:

Towns:

Links 
Linwei District Government's official website

Districts of Shaanxi
Weinan